Damien Top (born 13 July 1973, in Rouen) is a French tenor, musicologist and conductor, and is artistic director of the  International Albert Roussel Festival.

Career 
Damien Top is an exponent of contemporary French music as singer, conductor, composer and musicologist. Honoured by the French government in 2002 with the Prix Charles Oulmont  for his outstanding contributions to French culture, he serves as artistic director for the Lotte Lehmann Foundation, which he represents throughout the world in recitals and recordings.

Graduate of the Conservatoire of Lille and the Conservatoire National Supérieur de Musique de Paris, Damien Top studied with Galina Vishnevskaya, Jean-Christophe Benoît and Jacques Pottier. He has appeared in opera, operetta, and sacred works, as well as performing the entire range of French mélodie. In 1993, he was engaged by the Opéra de Paris-Bastille to sing in a new production of Benvenuto Cellini by Berlioz under the direction of Myung-whun Chung. In 2002, Damien Top sang and conducted the cantata L'oiseau a vu tout cela by Sauguet at the Académie Française.

Many contemporary composers have created works for him, including Jacques Chailley, who has proclaimed, "...l'art de Damien Top est exemplaire," as well as Isabelle Aboulker, Françoise Choveaux, Suzanne Joly, Alain Feron, Anthony Girard, Wally Karveno, Philippe Malhaire, Max Pinchard, Jean-Christophe Rosaz; the American Dianne Goolkasian Rahbee, Joni Greene, Isaac Schankler, the Belgian Marcel Cominotto, the Swiss Jean-Luc Darbellay, the New Zealander Edwin Carr, the Dutch composer Harry Cox, the Romanian Horia Surianu and the Australians Houston Dunleavy, Peter Tahourdin, Robert Trumble and Felix Werder. Top has recorded Massenet song cycles (BNL), romances of de Coussemaker (R.C.P.), art songs of Émile Goué (SyPr) and melodies of Claude Guillon-Verne (1879–1956), nephew of Jules Verne (1828–1905) (Azur Classical). “Diapason magazine” lauded him for his “impeccable taste.”

He has given recitals at Flâneries Musicales de Reims for the Yehudi Menuhin Foundation, Musicales en Valois, Festival des Grands Crus de Bourgogne, Festival de la Mélodie Française of Toulouse, as well as performances in Australia, Belgium, Canada, the Czech Republic, Spain, Germany, Great Britain, Italy, Macedonia, Mexico, New Zealand, and the United States.

A student of Sergiu Celibidache, he has conducted the Orchestre du Festival Roussel, the Joseph Jongen Ensemble, the Czech Chamber Soloists, and the Prague Philharmonic Chamber Orchestra, Mihail Jora Philharmonic Orchestra among others. In his programs, he focuses on the music of our time, rediscovering many neglected works of Albert Roussel, Vincent d'Indy, Claude Delvincourt, Jørgen Jersild, Hans Eklund, George Enescu, Claude Guillon-Verne, Jean-Louis Martinet, Pauli Sandagerdi, Bohuslav Martinů, Christophe Looten, Otmar Macha, Touve Ratovondrahety, José Soler Casabon, Peter Tahourdin and Maurice Thiriet.

Son of the poet Andrée Brunin, Damien Top gives poetry recitals (Alliance Française of Sydney, University of Melbourne, University of Hawaii at Manoa, Wo International Center at Punahou School), exploring a wide range of song texts and introducing the audience to the poetry of our time (Anthologie de la poésie française, Poètes féminins contemporains, Centenaire Paul Verlaine (1844–1876), etc.).

His biography of Albert Roussel was published in 2000 by Séguier. He has also written full length studies on Sergei Rachmaninoff (1873–1943), Émile Goué (1904–1946) and René de Castéra (1873–1955), for which he was awarded the Prix du Salon du Livre d’Hossegor. He is frequently invited to speak on radio and television (France Musique, France Culture, Hawaii Public Radio, Radio Suisse Romande; French TV station FR3, Nederlandse Programma Stichting TV); to present papers on French music at international conferences and to give masterclasses in French art song in Australia, at the University of Melbourne, Monash University, La Trobe University, the University of Performing Arts at Wollongong; in New Zealand at the Victoria University of Wellington; at the James Madison University in Virginia; and in Quebec, Canada, at the Université de Sherbrooke and the Université de Montréal. Top writes a monthly music column in Politique Magazine. Member of the Société des auteurs, compositeurs et éditeurs de musique (SACEM), his compositions have been played in France, Belgium, Italy and in the United States. A member of the board of directors of the Lotte Lehmann Foundation, he is also scientific advisor of the Bibliotheca della Memoria (Barletta - Italia), director of the Centre International Albert-Roussel which he founded in 1992 and of the Albert-Roussel International Festival.

Discography  

Jules Massenet : Poème d'avril, Poème du Souvenir, Poème d'hiver, Expressions Lyriques BNL 1992
Von Appel : Il triompho della musica, Naxos 2001
Edmond de Coussemaker : Romances et chansons, RCP 2003
Émile Goué : Mélodies, SyPr 2006
Albert Roussel, Jacques Ibert : Mélodies, Azur 2021
Claude Guillon-Verne : Mélodies, Azur 2021
Émile Goué : Mélodies avec quatuor, Azur

References 

1963 births
Living people
Musicians from Rouen
French male conductors (music)
French operatic tenors
20th-century French male opera singers
20th-century French conductors (music)
20th-century French musicologists
20th-century French male writers
21st-century French male opera singers
21st-century French conductors (music)
21st-century French male writers
21st-century musicologists
Conservatoire de Paris alumni